Raivis Dzintars (born 25 November 1982) is a Latvian right-wing politician and chairman of the national-conservative National Alliance party. He has previously served as the party's co-chairman alongside Gaidis Bērziņš.

Born in Riga, he was elected to the Saeima at the 2010 parliamentary election.  He was the Alliance's candidate for Prime Minister at the 2011 election, at which the party increased its number of seats from 8 to 14.

References

1982 births
Living people
Politicians from Riga
All for Latvia! politicians
National Alliance (Latvia) politicians
Deputies of the 10th Saeima
Deputies of the 11th Saeima
Deputies of the 12th Saeima
Deputies of the 13th Saeima
Deputies of the 14th Saeima
University of Latvia alumni